Guillermo "Guille" Andrés López (born 13 October 1992), is a Spanish footballer who plays for Atzeneta mainly as a forward.

Club career
Born in Xàtiva, Valencia, Guille finished his formation at Villarreal CF, making his debuts with the C-team in the 2010–11 campaign, in Tercera División. In the 2011 summer he joined CD Olímpic de Xàtiva in Segunda División B, appearing regularly and scoring two goals during his one-year spell.

In June 2012 Guille moved abroad, signing for Wigan Athletic F.C., being assigned to the U21 squad. On 24 July 2014 he returned to Spain, joining Real Valladolid and being initially assigned to the reserves also in the third level.

Guille made his first-team debut on 15 October, starting and scoring the first of a 2–0 home win over Girona FC for the season's Copa del Rey. Three days later he made his league debut, replacing André Leão in the 79th minute of a 0–0 home draw against SD Ponferradina in the Segunda División championship.

On 17 July 2015 Guille moved to another reserve team, Celta de Vigo B also in the third tier.

References

External links

1992 births
Living people
Spanish footballers
Footballers from the Valencian Community
Association football forwards
Segunda División players
Segunda División B players
Tercera División players
CD Olímpic de Xàtiva footballers
Real Valladolid Promesas players
Real Valladolid players
Celta de Vigo B players
RCD Espanyol B footballers
SCR Peña Deportiva players
Unionistas de Salamanca CF players
Mérida AD players
Atzeneta UE players
Wigan Athletic F.C. players
Slovak Super Liga players
FK Senica players
Spanish expatriate footballers
Expatriate footballers in England
Expatriate footballers in Slovakia
Spanish expatriate sportspeople in England
Spanish expatriate sportspeople in Slovakia